City chicken is an American entrée consisting of cubes of meat, which have been placed on a wooden skewer (approximately 4–5 inches long), then fried and/or baked. Depending on the recipe, they may be breaded. Despite the name of the dish, city chicken almost never contains chicken.

History
A similar dish once known as "mock chicken" was described as early as 1908. The first references to city chicken appeared in newspapers and cookbooks just prior to and during the Depression Era in a few cities such as Pittsburgh. City chicken typically has cooks using meat scraps to fashion a makeshift drumstick from them by skewering meat chunks.  It was a working-class food item.  During the Depression, cooks used pork or in some cases veal because it was then cheaper than chicken in many cities, especially meat packing centers such as Cincinnati, Cleveland, Louisville, and Pittsburgh where such cuts were more readily available than chicken.

Sometimes cooks would grind the meat and use a drumstick-shaped mold to form the ground meat around a skewer. One such mold, manufactured by AMPCO/BKI, was labeled chicken sans volaille (without poultry).

Additionally, if you look at the history of Binghamton, NY area where this dish is still very popular, at the turn of last century along with the growth of factories (especially EJ, cigar companies, Kilmer, etc.) the town was supplied with workers from immigrant communities abroad as well as from the coal mines of PA, stone quarries of northern NY, etc. Many/most of these were from more rural areas where farming for personal use to supplement their jobs was common (i.e. small vegetable gardens, hogs and chickens). In the tenement and row houses in Binghamton/JC of that era it was rare to have enough/any land to raise chickens however slaughter houses (pork, lamb, veal, and beef) could still be located 'in town'. The idea of breading veal or pork like fried chicken became a cheaper and popular meal.

Distribution
The dish is popular in cities throughout the central and eastern Great Lakes region of Ohio and Michigan as well as the northeastern Appalachian regions of Pennsylvania and Upstate New York, and at least as far south and west as Louisville, Kentucky. City chicken is commonly found in the metropolitan areas of Cincinnati, Cleveland, Detroit, Binghamton, Erie, Pittsburgh, Buffalo and Scranton, hence, the dish's "urban" title. In Canada, it is quite popular in the ethnic Ukrainian regions of the west, and the deli-counter version is popular in the Ottawa Valley and Kitchener area.

Variations
While preparations regionally vary, pork is typically the base meat used in most versions of the recipe. Pittsburgh-area City Chicken is almost always breaded and usually baked, while in Binghamton NY, the meat is marinated, battered and then deep fried. The Cleveland version is generally baked without breading and instead the meat is dredged in flour, browned in a pan, then finished in the oven, and served with gravy. Grocery stores in both the Greater Cleveland area as well as those in the Pittsburgh metro area and Detroit metropolitan area include wooden skewers with pork cubes specifically packaged as city chicken. In Ottawa, Ontario, Canada, at least one variation involves skewers of three kinds of meat: pork, veal, and beef. Another Canadian variation, from Saskatoon, Saskatchewan, was composed entirely of veal.

In Cincinnati the dish appeared on the 1933 lunch menu of upscale La Normandie as baked city chicken "en brochette".

In 1940 Crisco ran national ads featuring a recipe for city chicken, which gave the dish "some national traction", according to Keith Pandolfini writing in the Cincinnati Enquirer.

See also
Chicken fried steak
Spiedie
Souvlaki
Kebab
Kushikatsu

References

Sources
Various Recipes
That's Not What The Recipe Says: Binghamton Bound with City Chicken 
City Chicken

Skewered foods
Pennsylvania Dutch cuisine
Culture of Cleveland
Cuisine of the Midwestern United States
American meat dishes